Mirificarma flavonigrella is a moth of the family Gelechiidae. It is found in Algeria.

The wingspan is about 6 mm for males. Adults are on wing in May.

References

Moths described in 1915
Mirificarma
Endemic fauna of Algeria
Moths of Africa